is a Japanese talent agency based in Tokyo, which handles mainly voice actors.

Attached talent

Male

Shun Horie
Yuu Kawada
Shou Kiraike
Kosuke Kobayashi
Taro Masuoka
Kenichi Mine
Masato Nishino
Nobuhiko Okamoto
Koji Seki
Yoku Shioya
Kouichi Souma
Ryo Sugisaki
Shinya Takahashi
Takuya Tsuda

Female

Fairouz Ai
Rie Haduki
Ikumi Hasegawa
Hikaru Iida
Manaka Iwami
Akari Kitō
Manami Komori
Keiko Manaka
Nozomi Masu
Akane Misaka
Marie Miyake
Fumi Morisawa
Juri Nagatsuma
Kumiko Nakane
Sachiko Okada
Misaki Oshima
Misano Sakai
Yukina Shuto
Natsumi Takamori
Tomoyo Takayanagi
Tomomi Tanaka
Hana Hishikawa

Former talent

Taito Ban (moved to Office Osawa)
Shizuka Ishigami (moved to Office Osawa)
Kaito Ishikawa (moved to Stay-Luck)
Haruki Ishiya  (moved to Office Osawa)
Ai Kayano (moved to Office Osawa)
Minoru Shiraishi (moved to GadgetLink)
Hiroshi Watanabe (moved to Kenyu Office)
Aoi Yūki (moved to Aoni Production)

History
The company was founded on 4 November 2003.
The company announced to be close in March 2022.
32 voice actors will transfer to new talent agency called Raccoon Dog established by voice actor Nobuhiko Okamoto in April 2022.

External links
  

Mass media companies established in 2003
Japanese voice actor management companies
Mass media in Tokyo